Jacques Dumesnil (born Marie Émile Eugène André Joly; November 9, 1903 – May 8, 1998) was a French film and television actor.

Early life
Jacques Dumesnil was born as Marie Émile Eugène André Joly on November 9, 1903 in Paris, France.
Before becoming an actor, he received training as a mechanical engineer.  After starting as a secretary at the aviation school, he became an industrial designer, a profession he left to devote himself to the theater.

Career
He adopted the pseudonym Dumesnil because of the admiration he had to French actor Camille Dumény.

He started out as a fanciful singer in a café located in Paris Place de l'Hôtel de Ville, he was paid in sandwiches and glasses of beer.

Dumesnil started on stage in 1927 and divided his career between theater and cinema.  Having spent two years at the Comédie-Française, he played among other things in Les Tontons flingueurs and provided the French voice of Charlie Chaplin in Monsieur Verdoux (1947) and A King in New York (1957).

His role as Duke of Plessis-Vaudreuil in the television series Au plaisir de Dieu, earned him a resurgence of popularity and the 7 d'Or for best actor.

Personal life
Jacques Dumesnil had a son, Pierre Joly dit Dumesnil, who was a French swimming champion and participated in the 1952 Summer Olympics in Helsinki, Finland.

Death

Dumesnil died on May 8, 1998 in Bron, Rhône. He was buried three days later in the Miribel Cemetery in Miribel, Ain, the town where his sister Odette Joly had been a teacher and where he had chosen to study.  install at the end of its life. Since then, a rue de Miribel has also been called “rue Jacques-Dumesnil”.

Filmography

References

Bibliography
 Crisp, C.G. The classic French cinema, 1930-1960. Indiana University Press, 1993.
 Hayward, Susan. Simone Signoret: The Star as Cultural Sign. Continuum, 2004.

External links

1903 births
1998 deaths
French male film actors
French male television actors
Male actors from Paris
20th-century French male actors
Commandeurs of the Ordre des Arts et des Lettres